HMS Newark was an 80-gun third rate ship of the line of the Royal Navy, launched at Hull on 3 June 1695.

She was rebuilt according to the 1706 Establishment at Chatham Dockyard, and relaunched on 29 July 1717. During this rebuild an extra gundeck was added to make her a three-decker, instead of the two-decker as which she had been originally built. She continued to be classified as a third rate, however. 

On 24 April 1741 she was ordered to be taken to pieces and rebuilt at Chatham according to the 1741 proposals of the 1719 Establishment. She was relaunched on 27 August 1747, as a 66-gun Third Rate, two-decker. Newark jammed halfway down the stocks during the launch and was left there for several days, after which she unjammed herself and completed the launching.

Newark continued to serve until 1787, when she was broken up.

Notes

References

Lavery, Brian (2003) The Ship of the Line – Volume 1: The development of the battlefleet 1650–1850. Conway Maritime Press. .

External links
 

Ships of the line of the Royal Navy
1690s ships